The 1910 Ursinus football team was an American football team that represented Ursinus College during the 1910 college football season. The team compiled a 6–1 record and outscored opponents by a total of 157 to 18. John B. Price was the head coach.

Schedule

References

Ursinus
Ursinus Bears football seasons
Ursinus football